In 2021 France reached a total of 18,676 megawatts (MW) installed wind power capacity placing France at that time as the world's seventh largest wind power nation by installed capacity, behind the United Kingdom and Brazil and ahead of Canada and Italy. According to the IEA the yearly wind production was 20.2 TWh in 2015, representing almost 23% of the 88.4 TWh from renewable sources in France during that year. Wind provided 4.3% of the country’s electricity demand in 2015.

France has the second largest wind potential in Europe. The country's large wind power potential is due to its large land area and extensive agricultural landscape where turbines may be located more readily as well as access to considerable offshore resources.

Timeline of developments 
2022

In February 2022, French President Emmanuel Macron announced that France was to build 50 offshore wind farms with a combined capacity of at least 40 GW by 2050.

2019

In 2019, Emmanuel Macron confirmed France’s pledge to add 1 GW offshore wind every year between 2020-2024 as laid out in France’s new draft energy plan (PPE).

2016

While France has been a relative late developer in wind power compared to other European countries it has set the target of more than doubling onshore wind power capacity from 2015 levels by 2023.  Offshore wind power is scheduled to come online from 2018 for the first time and including marine energy could rise to up to 11.1 GW of power by 2023. Realisation of these plans would more than likely see France overtake highly ranked Spain in terms of installed capacity by 2023.

2015

By year-end 2015 the total onshore installed capacity of 10,358 MW consisted of 5,956 turbines, with the average turbine at just under 2 MW of power. Newer turbines may be larger following the development of wind power in the last decades. The leading regions in France in 2015 were Champagne-Ardenne with an installed capacity of 1,682 MW, Picardie with 1,502 MW, Centre with 872 MW and Bretagne with 836 MW.

2006

Installed capacity rises above 1 GW for the first time during the year.

2001

The French government initially planned to produce 21% of its electricity consumption with renewable energy in 2010 to comply with European directive 2001/77/CE of 27 September 2001. This means that France had to produce 106 TWh of renewable energy in 2010, up from 71 TWh in 2006. Wind power represents 75% of the 35 TWh additional production in 2010.

Installed capacity

Future projections

Onshore

Onshore wind power is projected to rise to 15,000 MW by 2018 and between a low target scenario of 21,800 MW and a high target scenario of 26,000 MW by 2023.

Offshore

Between 2004 and 2011, high price and local fishing communities prevented some projects in the public ocean domain. After 2013, information was improved, and permissioning was moved from local to national regulatory authority.

The commercial offshore wind power project came on line in 2022 with 480 MW capacity. By 2023 another traditional 3,000 MW of capacity is expected to come online with an additional 500 to 6,000 MW of performance dependent installation planned. Marine energy including floating wind turbines will add an additional 100 MW as well as an additional 200 to 2000 MW of capacity by 2023. Overall including marine energy offshore installed capacity will rise to between 3,100 and 11,100 MW by 2023. French law requires owners to decommission facilities at their end-of-life.

Offshore wind farms

The following offshore windfarm projects listed have submitted their applications for consent.

Floating turbine test sites
France is operating a number of offshore test sites for prototype floating wind turbines which would allow turbines to be located in deeper waters. These include the Nenaphur test site, the Nenuphar twin float, the Floatgen Project and the Sem-Rev Site d'Experimentation en Mer which also tests wave energy converters.

On 30 April 2021, the French government launched a call for tenders for the first floating wind farm project in France. The wind farm is to be situated in southern Brittany and will generate between 230 and 270 MW when operating at capacity.

See also

Renewable energy in France
Solar power in France
Renewable energy by country
Wind power in the European Union

References